Adriana "Adrianinha" Moisés Pinto (born December 6, 1978) is a Brazilian female basketball player. She spent 17 years with the Brazil women's national basketball team, from 1997 to 2016.  Among her accomplishments with the national team are participations in four Summer Olympics, winning a bronze at the 2000 edition in Sydney, four World Championship appearances – with her best position being a fourth place at home in 2006 – and titles in American and South American championships. Moisés retired from the national team following the 2014 FIBA World Championship for Women, expressing an interest in becoming a basketball coach. However, coach Antonio Carlos Barbosa invited her in late 2015 to join the team that was preparing for the 2016 Olympics in Rio de Janeiro, and Moisés felt interested in representing Brazil at home.

On a club level, Moisés played in 2001 and 2002 for the WNBA's Phoenix Mercury, and was waived by the team prior to the 2007 season. She has also played in Italy, Russia and Croatia. Moises has a daughter, Aaliyah (b. 2006), from a relationship with A.J. Guyton.

See also 
 List of athletes with the most appearances at Olympic Gamesa

References

External links
 

1978 births
Living people
People from Franca
Brazilian women's basketball players
Olympic basketball players of Brazil
Basketball players at the 1999 Pan American Games
Basketball players at the 2000 Summer Olympics
Basketball players at the 2004 Summer Olympics
Basketball players at the 2007 Pan American Games
Basketball players at the 2008 Summer Olympics
Basketball players at the 2012 Summer Olympics
Basketball players at the 2016 Summer Olympics
Brazilian expatriate basketball people in the United States
Olympic bronze medalists for Brazil
Olympic medalists in basketball
Phoenix Mercury players
Point guards
ŽKK Gospić players
Brazilian expatriate basketball people in Croatia
Medalists at the 2000 Summer Olympics
Pan American Games silver medalists for Brazil
Pan American Games bronze medalists for Brazil
Pan American Games medalists in basketball
Medalists at the 2003 Pan American Games
Medalists at the 2007 Pan American Games
Medalists at the 2011 Pan American Games
Sportspeople from São Paulo (state)